Turovo is a rural locality (a village) in Kargopolsky District, Arkhangelsk Oblast, Russia. The population was 12 as of 2012.

Geography 
Turovo is located 16 km north of Kargopol (the district's administrative centre) by road. Petrovskaya is the nearest rural locality.

References 

Rural localities in Kargopolsky District